Quarters 1, also known as Building 1, is a historic officer's quarters located at Fort Monroe, Hampton, Virginia. The original section was built in 1819, and consists of a three-story, central block, double pile residence with flanking, two-story wings in the Federal style.  The northern wing, containing a large kitchen and cistern below, was erected as a separate building in 1823 and later connected to the main building in 1871.  The 1871 connecting structure includes an octagonal solarium.  The front facade features two-story porches, with carpenter Gothic railings, that were added during the last quarter of the 19th century.  The interior features an elliptical staircase and an elliptical dome.

The building was designed as a residence and headquarters for Fort Monroe's commanding officer.  It served as headquarters of Fort Monroe from 1819 to 1907. It served as the quarters used by Abraham Lincoln while planning the attack on Norfolk during the American Civil War. Fort Monroe was decommissioned on September 15, 2011.

It was listed on the National Register of Historic Places in 2011.

References

External links

Fort Monroe, Quarters No. 1, 151 Bernard Road, Hampton, Hampton, VA: 13 photos, 5 measured drawings, 6 data pages, and 1 photo caption page at Historic American Buildings Survey

Historic American Buildings Survey in Virginia
Houses on the National Register of Historic Places in Virginia
Federal architecture in Virginia
Houses completed in 1819
Houses in Hampton, Virginia
National Register of Historic Places in Hampton, Virginia